Neomochtherus pallipes, the Devon red-legged robber fly, is a species of robber fly in the family Asilidae.

References

Further reading

External links

 
 
 

Asilidae
Insects described in 1820
Brachyceran flies of Europe